Panjapur is an area of Tiruchirappalli suburbs of Edamalaipatti Pudur of Trichy in Tamil Nadu, India. It comes under the city limit with Tiruchirappalli city corporation and Tiruchirappalli West taluk. Ward 39 of Trichy corporation covers Panjapur.

Neighbourhoods and suburbs of Tiruchirappalli